Jessie Ward, sometimes credited as Jessica Ward, is a classically trained ballerina, and an American film and television actress.

Early life

She was born on February 18, 1982, in Manasquan, New Jersey. Ward began studying ballet seriously at the age of nine.  She lived and studied at the School of American Ballet as a teenager and attended high school at the Professional Children's School in New York. She was chosen as the highest scoring dancer in the United States by Britain’s Royal Academy of Dance, which earned her a ballet scholarship to study in England. She has performed numerous solo and principal roles with various professional ballet companies across the United States.

Career

Ward left New York and moved to Los Angeles to pursue her acting career. She has appeared in numerous national television commercials as well as performing in a music video with Jennifer Lopez. In March 2006, she appeared in a guest role as Brianna on FX Network’s It’s Always Sunny in Philadelphia alongside Eddie Mekka and Danny DeVito.  Ward played the female lead opposite Tatum O’Neal in Wicked Wicked Games in 2006-2007, which was her second appearance on MyNetworkTV, her first being cast as Penelope in Desire in 2006.

Since then she has appeared as a guest star on CSI:Crime Scene Investigation in 2007, and was cast as the female lead in a thriller called Rest Stop: Don’t Look Back in 2008.  She has also appeared in other film and TV programs such as: Godspeed, One Tree Hill, Reed Between the Lines, What to Expect When You’re Expecting and The Game.

Filmography

References

External links
Jessie Ward's Official Website

1982 births
American television actresses
Living people
People from Manasquan, New Jersey
American film actresses
Actresses from New Jersey
21st-century American actresses